Daniele Franceschini (born 13 January 1976) is an Italian football manager and former midfielder, who played as a left winger.

Club career

In mid-2006, Franceschini joined another Serie A club Sampdoria. After 4 seasons in Genoa city, Franceschini moved to Atletico Roma in mid-2010.

Managerial career
In February 2016, Franceschini was appointed as the head coach of Lega Pro struggler Martina Franca.

In mid-2017, Franceschini was appointed as the coach ( or ) of Italy national under-18 team. His debut match was a draw. His  team won the next match.

Franceschini led the team in 2018 Mediterranean Games. The team won the silver medal.

References

External links

Living people
1976 births
Footballers from Rome
Association football midfielders
Italian footballers
S.S. Lazio players
U.S. Lecce players
Calcio Foggia 1920 players
U.C. Sampdoria players
A.C. ChievoVerona players
A.S.D. Castel di Sangro Calcio players
Serie A players
Serie B players